Pseudodrephalys atinas is butterfly that is commonly found in south east Peru (Amazonian region).  It belongs to the family Hesperiidae.

References
http://www.ftp.funet.fi/index/Tree_of_life/insecta/lepidoptera/ditrysia/hesperioidea/hesperiidae/pyrginae/pseudodrephalys/index.html#NL4A

Pyrgini
Butterflies described in 1888
Hesperiidae of South America
Taxa named by Paul Mabille